Maylene is an unincorporated community in Shelby County, Alabama, United States. While the community was once unincorporated, it is now part of southern Alabaster. Maylene has a post office with ZIP code 35114. One site in Maylene, the Meredith-McLaughlin House (McLaughlin Farm), is listed on the Alabama Register of Landmarks and Heritage.

Notable people
Dave Mader III, stock car racing driver
Al Veach, former pitcher for the Philadelphia Athletics

References

Unincorporated communities in Shelby County, Alabama
Unincorporated communities in Alabama
Neighborhoods in Alabama